This is a list of advice podcasts.

Entries are ordered by their released dates of the first episode.

List 

Case Notes

1970 
You and Yours (October)

2007 
Midwest Teen Sex Show (June 6)

2010 
Employee of the Month
My Brother, My Brother and Me (April 12)

2013 
If I Were You (May 13)

2014 
mürmur.  (December 23)

2015 
Another Round (March 24)
Dear Hank & John (June 7)

2016 
Dopey (January)

2017 
Why Won't You Date Me? (December 1)

2018 
Call Her Daddy (October 3)

2019 
Were You Raised By Wolves? (September 9)

2020 
The Two Norries

References 

 
Lists of podcasts
Infotainment